Rinzing Bhutia (born 17 August 1986) is an Indian cricketer. He made his first-class debut for Sikkim in the 2018–19 Ranji Trophy on 30 December 2018. He made his Twenty20 debut for Sikkim in the 2018–19 Syed Mushtaq Ali Trophy on 28 February 2019.

References

External links
 

1986 births
Living people
Indian cricketers
Sikkim cricketers
Place of birth missing (living people)